Steven Horvat (born 14 March 1971) is an Australian former professional soccer player.

Club career
A graduate of the Australian Institute of Sport, Horvat began his career with Melbourne Croatia. He later played with Sunshine George Cross, North Geelong Warriors, the Melbourne Knights (for whom he won the Joe Marston Medal), Hajduk Split, Crystal Palace (although he didn't make a league appearance) and Carlton. He retired in March 2003 at the age of 32. Horvat made a total of 96 appearances in the National Soccer League.

International career
Horvat was a regular member of the Australian national side, making 32 appearances between 1994 and 2002, and participated in a number of international competitions, including the 1987 FIFA U-16 World Championship, 1996 Summer Olympics, 1997 FIFA Confederations Cup, 2001 FIFA Confederations Cup and 2002 OFC Nations Cup. Horvat also played in the game with highest scoreline in an international football match, when Australia beat American Samoa 31–0.

Personal life
Horvat has a daughter, Chantel, who plays basketball at the University of California, Los Angeles.

References

External links

1971 births
Living people
Association football defenders
Australian soccer players
Australian expatriate soccer players
Australia international soccer players
Australian expatriate sportspeople in England
Australian Institute of Sport soccer players
Australian people of Croatian descent
Croatian Football League players
Carlton S.C. players
Crystal Palace F.C. players
HNK Hajduk Split players
Melbourne Knights FC players
National Soccer League (Australia) players
North Geelong Warriors FC players
Olympic soccer players of Australia
People educated at Geelong College
Caroline Springs George Cross FC players
Footballers at the 1996 Summer Olympics
1997 FIFA Confederations Cup players
2000 OFC Nations Cup players
2001 FIFA Confederations Cup players
2002 OFC Nations Cup players
Sportspeople from Geelong
Soccer players from Victoria (Australia)
Australian expatriate sportspeople in Croatia
Expatriate footballers in Croatia
Expatriate footballers in England
Sportsmen from Victoria (Australia)